Chi Heorot (often referred to simply as "Heorot" or "XH") is a local fraternity at Dartmouth College in Hanover, New Hampshire.

History
Heorot was founded in 1897 as a local fraternity called Alpha Alpha Omega. In 1902 it was granted a charter as the Chi chapter of Chi Phi. Soon after, the fraternity moved to its present location on East Wheelock Street, and in 1927 sold off its eighteenth-century house and built the house that stands today.

By the mid-1900s, the Dartmouth chapter of Chi Phi was having some issues with its national charter. Some of these disagreements are alleged to have regarded the admission of an African-American student into the Dartmouth chapter, in violation of Chi Phi rules of the time.  In 1968 the house finally disassociated from the national fraternity.

The house then became Chi Phi Heorot. After several suspensions by the college in the early eighties, it re-joined the national in 1982. However, in the winter of 1985 the brothers of Heorot attempted to turn the central hall on the first floor of the house into an ice hockey rink by flooding it and opening the doors to allow Hanover's subzero winter temperatures to freeze the water. This caused the floor to fall through into the basement, resulting in costly damage that the national organization refused to help pay to fix.  Because of this lack of support from the national, Heorot again opted to become a local fraternity, and the college assumed ownership of the property and house.

Naming
After its final disassociation from the national in 1985, the fraternity chose the name Chi Heorot, derived from the medieval poem Beowulf. Heorot is the great hall where warriors converge to tell their stories, described by the anonymous author in the following excerpt:

Then, as I have heard, the work of constructing a building
Was proclaimed to many a tribe throughout this middle earth.
In time – quickly, as such things happen among men – 
It was all ready, the biggest of halls.
He whose word was law 
Far and wide gave it the name ‘Heorot’.

The men did not dally; they strode inland in a group 
Until they were able to discern the timbered hall, 
Splendid and ornamented with gold.  
The building in which that powerful man held court 
Was the foremost of halls under heaven; 
Its radiance shone over many lands..

Athletics
Heorot draws a good deal of its brotherhood from a variety of varsity athletic teams; ice hockey, baseball, soccer, rowing, and Nordic and alpine skiing are all well represented. Notable alumni include Gerry Geran '18, Adam Nelson '97, and Andrew Weibrecht '09, who have won Olympic medals in ice hockey, shot put, and ski racing respectively. NHL hockey players Lee Stempniak, David Jones, Hugh Jessiman, Tanner Glass, Ben Lovejoy, J.T. Wyman and Matt Lindblad are also members.

References

Local fraternities and sororities
Dartmouth College Greek organizations
Student organizations established in 1897
1897 establishments in New Hampshire
Fraternities and sororities in the United States